Lords of the Levee is a 1943 non-fiction book by longtime Chicago Tribune reporters Lloyd Wendt and Herman Kogan in one of three collaborations about the city of Chicago, focusing on its politicians "Bathhouse" John Coughlin and "Hinky Dink" Kenna, notorious alderman for the City of Chicago's lakeside First Ward. The book was reprinted in 1967 by Indiana University Press. In 1974, Indiana University Press published the book again under the title Bosses in Lusty Chicago, along with a new introduction by Illinois Senator Paul Douglas. The book appeared under its original title in 2005 when it was reprinted by Northwestern University Press.

Further reading
Abbott, Karen (2007) Sin in the Second City: Madams, Ministers, Playboys, and the Battle for America's Soul. New York: Random House 
 (reissued under title Bosses in Lusty Chicago, 1967 by Indiana University Press, Bloomington ; reissued as Lords of the Levee, 2005 by Northwestern University Press, Evanston )

See also
Gray Wolves of Chicago

1943 non-fiction books
History books about the United States
History of Chicago
Non-fiction books about organized crime
Collaborative non-fiction books
Bobbs-Merrill Company books